Beazley PLC is the British parent company of specialist insurance businesses with operations in Europe, the US, and Asia.  Beazley manages six Lloyd's syndicates. Beazley plc is incorporated in the UK. It is listed on the London Stock Exchange and is a constituent of the FTSE 100 Index.

History
Beazley Group began life in 1986 as Beazley, Furlonge & Hiscox; Hiscox was bought out in 1992 and a full management buyout took place in 2001. Andrew Beazley served as chief executive until September 2008 when he was succeeded by Andrew Horton. Horton was succeeded by Adrian Cox in April 2021.

Operations
Beazley underwrites a diverse book of insurance and reinsurance business for clients worldwide.  Beazley's business is divided into six operating divisions: Cyber & Executive Risk, Marine & Aviation, Political, Accident & Contingency (PAC), Property, Reinsurance and Specialty Lines.  Beazley is a market leader in many of its chosen lines, which include professional indemnity, directors and officers, crime, healthcare, property, environmental liability, cyber liability, marine, reinsurance, accident and life, and political risks and contingency business.

References

External links
Official website

Financial services companies established in 1986
Insurance companies of the United Kingdom
Companies listed on the London Stock Exchange